Monroe is a townland in County Westmeath, Ireland.

Monroe is one of 8 townlands of the civil parish of Portloman in the barony of Corkaree in the Province of Leinster. The neighbouring townlands are: Wattstown to the north, Portloman to the east, Scurlockstown  to the south, Monroe or Johnstown (Nugent) to the west and Johnstown to the north–west.

In the 1911 census of Ireland there were 3 houses and 11 inhabitants in the townland.

References

External links
Map of Monroe at openstreetmap.org
Monroe at The IreAtlas Townland Data Base
Monroe at Townlands.ie
 Monroe at the Placenames Database of Ireland

Townlands of County Westmeath